Billy J. Beckwith (June 27, 1975 – December 2, 2013) was an American carpenter.

Born in Warren, a town in Knox County, Maine, Beckwith studied English and martial arts at the University of Montana. He began his career in 2002 and was best known for co-hosting HGTV's home improvement series Curb Appeal with John Gidding for two seasons.

Beckwith was involved in a motorcycle accident on December 2, 2013, and later died in the hospital.

References

1975 births
2013 deaths
People from Warren, Maine
American carpenters
Road incident deaths in California
Motorcycle road incident deaths